James Ham may refer to:

 James Milton Ham (1920–1997), Canadian engineer and university administrator
 James Richard Ham (1921–2002), Roman Catholic bishop